Bitter Creek is an 80-mile-long stream in the U.S. state of Wyoming. It passes through several Wyoming counties including Sweetwater and Carbon.  The creek rises near the Delaney Rim on the western side of Wyoming's Red Desert in Carbon County.  For most of its course, Bitter Creek parallels the path of the transcontinental railroad, and the modern route of Interstate 80.  It flows through the cities of Rock Springs and Green River before emptying into the Green River.

In the coal mining heyday for Rock Springs in the late 19th century, the creek formed a boundary between a Union Pacific coal mining camp on the south, and an encampment of Chinese immigrant workers on the north.
On September 2, 1885, a mob of white miners, angry over labor and racial tensions, took control of several bridges over the creek, and attacked the Chinese encampment in the Rock Springs Massacre.

Several railroad-built bridges cross the creek at various points between the two towns. A dirt road used for tower access of a Green River radio station KUGR, requires a high clearance vehicle with four wheel drive to cross the creek. Most of the roads that run parallel to the creek in Sweetwater County are on railroad property.

It was referred to in the TV show M*A*S*H (Season 5 Episode 20) as the hometown for Cpl. Mulligan.

Climate

According to the Köppen Climate Classification system, Bitter Creek has a cold semi-arid climate, abbreviated "BSk" on climate maps.

See also
 Rock Springs Massacre
 List of rivers of Wyoming

References

External links
 

Rivers of Wyoming
Rivers of Sweetwater County, Wyoming
Rivers of Carbon County, Wyoming